Plasmodium lygosomae is a parasite of the genus Plasmodium subgenus Carinamoeba.

Like all Plasmodium species P. lygosomae has both vertebrate and insect hosts. The vertebrate hosts for this parasite are reptiles.

Description 

The parasite was first described by Laird in 1951.

The schizonts give rise to 4 merozoites.

The gametocytes are elongate in form.

Distribution 

This species is found in New Zealand.

Hosts 

The only known host is the lizard Lygosoma moco. This host species has recently been renamed Oligosoma moco.

References 

lygosomae